Ali Shilatifard is an American biochemist/molecular biologist, the Robert Francis Furchgott Professor and Chairman of the department of biochemistry and molecular genetics, and the director of the Simpson Query Institute for Epigenetics at the Northwestern University Feinberg School of Medicine. He has served as a senior editor for the journal Science, and currently serves as the Editor for Science's open access journal Science Advances. Research in Shilatifard's lab focuses on the cause of childhood leukemia through chromosomal translocations, the role of ELL in this process, and the discovery of the Super Elongation Complex as being a central complex linking MLL translocations into a diverse number of genes to leukemic pathogenesis.

Biography 
Shilatifard has said he developed his love of science as a young boy working with and observing his grandfather, a physician/scientist and professor of medicine of the University of Tehran.   Shilatifard moved to the United States in 1984 where he began his study of organic chemistry at Kennesaw State University in Georgia.  He began to work on his doctoral degree in biochemistry at the  University of Georgia, Athens. Shilatifard completed his Ph.D. from the University of Oklahoma where his mentor, Dr. Richard Cummings, had moved his program.  As a Jane Coffin Childs Postdoctoral Fellow at the Oklahoma Medical Research Foundation, Shilatifard identified the first function of any of the MLL translocation partners found in leukemia and proposed that transcriptional elongation control is central to leukemia pathogenesis. Shilatifard began his independent lab in the Edward A. Doisy Department of Biochemistry and Molecular Biology at the St. Louis University School of Medicine, where he identified the first histone H3 lysine 4 (H3K4) methylase in Saccharomyces cerevisiae: which he named Set1/COMPASS; and defined the pathway of histone H3K4 methylation which is highly conserved from yeast to human. Studies from Shilatifard’s laboratory linking epigenetic factors and transcription elongation control to malignancies have provided therapeutic approaches for the treatment of these cancers. He also served on the Life Sciences jury for the Infosys Prize in 2017.
On April 12, 2019, Shilatifard presented "Childhood Leukemia: On the Edge of Extinction!"  at TEDxUofIChicago.

References

External links 
 
 

1966 births
Living people
American biochemists
American molecular biologists
Kennesaw State University alumni
University of Oklahoma alumni
Iranian biochemists
Stowers Institute for Medical Research people